Drozdov (masculine) or Drozdova (feminine) is a Russian surname. It is derived from the sobriquet дрозд (drozd, meaning "thrush", "blackbird") and may refer to:

 Alexander Drozdov (born 1970), Russian politician
 Aleksey Drozdov (born 1983), Russian decathlete
 Darren Drozdov (born 1969), American essayist and professional wrestler
 Filaret Drozdov (1782-1867), Metropolitan of Moscow and Kolomna
 Nikolai Drozdov (born 1937), Russian broadcaster and naturalist
 Serhii Drozdov (born 1962), Ukrainian military sniper pilot, commander of the Ukrainian Air Force in 2015-2021
 Yuri Drozdov (born 1972), Russian football player and coach
 Yuri Drozdov (1925–2017), Major General, KGB

See also
 
 Drozd (surname)
Drozda surname

Russian-language surnames